Episcopalianism in Scotland may refer to:

 Episcopalianism in the Church of Scotland
 Scottish Episcopal Church